Arthur Astley (11 March 1881 – September 1915) was a British track and field athlete from Lancashire. He was a member of the Salford Harriers. Astley competed at the 1908 Summer Olympics in London where he ran the 800 metres, finishing second in his semi-final (first round) heat with a time of 1:59.9.  He did not advance to the final. The next day, Astley also took second place in his preliminary heat of the 400 metres, not advancing to the semifinals.

References

Sources
 
 
 
 

1881 births
1915 deaths
English male middle-distance runners
English male sprinters
British male middle-distance runners
British male sprinters
Olympic athletes of Great Britain
Athletes (track and field) at the 1908 Summer Olympics
Deaths from cancer in England